The Chevrolet 153 cu in engine was an inline-four engine designed in the early 1960s for use in the Chevy II. It is a four-cylinder variant of the Turbo-Thrift six-cylinder engine. After 1970 GM ceased production of the 153 engine in North America because of low demand (and the inline-six was thereafter made the base engine in the Nova), but the engine continued to be used in cars in other markets around the world, notably South Africa and Brazil. The engine was also standard equipment in the Jeep DJ-5A—used by the United States Postal Service—until American Motors bought Kaiser Jeep in 1970 and replaced the engine with the AMC straight-six in the DJ-5B. Currently descendants of the 153 engine are used in industrial (e.g. forklifts and generators) and marine applications. The 153 engine is entirely different from the  Iron Duke engine introduced by Pontiac in 1977, most noticeably never having featured the Pontiac engine's crossflow cylinder head, but the two are often confused today.

Earlier when Chevrolet first became a division of General Motors in 1917, the OHV Chevrolet Inline-4 engine was manufactured from 1913 until 1928 when it was replaced by the "Stovebolt Six".

History
The compact Chevrolet Corvair was introduced in 1960 to compete with the Ford Falcon and Plymouth Valiant, but was handily outsold by its competitors. Fearing the Corvair's more radical engineering (featuring a rear-mounted air-cooled flat-six engine) was not appealing to consumers GM hastily approved the design of a new, more conventional compact car to compete with the Falcon and Valiant. Within 18 months the design of the Chevy II was completed, including new  four-cylinder and  six-cylinder engines to power it.

The 153 cu in engine had a  bore and  stroke, with two overhead valves per cylinder actuated by pushrods and a 1-3-4-2 firing order. The 230 cu in six and 153 cu in four are thus essentially the same design, differing only in cylinder count.

In the Chevy II the engine was branded as the Super-Thrift 153, while in the 1964 Chevy Van it was called the High Torque 153.

After the 1970 model year the engine was discontinued in North America.

Brazil
The 153 engine was used by GM do Brasil in their first locally-made product, the 1968 Chevrolet Opala. This 2,471 cc variant of the engine was in production in the Opala until 1992. Coincidentally the bore and stroke are the exact same as the Pontiac Iron Duke engine introduced in North America in 1977, but the two engines are otherwise unrelated and do not share parts. As is customary in Brazil the engine was refit to accept ethanol fuel.

South Africa
This engine was a mainstay for GMSA, who built it in their Aloes Plant (on the northern edge of Port Elizabeth) for installation in a wide range of cars. Two smaller displacement versions of this engine were also built there: a  variant using the 153's bore and the Brazilian 151 cu in engine's  stroke, and a  variant which used the 153's stroke and the 194 cu in six-cylinder's  bore. The engine was also used by the SADF in the Eland armoured car from the Mk. 5 upgrade.

Argentina
GM de Argentina designed their own  variant of the engine called the Chevrolet 110. The smaller displacement was achieved by using the  bore of the 194 cu in straight-six and a unique, short  stroke. The engine was designed for use in the locally-built Opel K 180, in production from 1974 to 1978.

Applications
 1962–1970 Chevrolet Chevy II / Nova
 1962–1965 Acadian (Canada)
 1963–1965 Chevrolet P10 Step-Van
 1964 Chevrolet Van/GMC Handi-Van
 1968–1970 Jeep DJ-5A
 1968–1973 Chevrolet Opala (Brazil) - 153 - USA
 1974–1992 Chevrolet Opala (Brazil) - 151 - Brazil
 1971–1975 Chevrolet Firenza (2.5, South Africa)
 1974–1978 Opel K 180 (1.8, Argentina)
 197?–1978 Chevrolet 2500 (2.5, South Africa)
 1975–1978 Chevrolet 1900 (2.0, South Africa)
 1976–1982 Chevrolet Chevair (2.0 and 2.3, South Africa)
 1978–1982 Chevrolet Rekord (2.3, South Africa)

Vortec 3000
GM produced a variant of the 153 for use in industrial and marine applications, with the Brazilian version's larger  bore and a longer  stroke. The resulting  engine, branded the Vortec 3000, was never installed in passenger cars. 

Later variants of the Vortec 3000 had modified cylinder heads where machined bosses were drilled for use with multipoint fuel injection.

References

Chevrolet engines
Straight-four engines
Gasoline engines by model